The XXVI Army Corps was an infantry corps of the Royal Italian Army during World War I, the Italian invasion of Albania, and the Greco-Italian War and the subsequent Italian occupation of Greece during World War II.

History
The XXV Corps was first established in Castelfranco Veneto on 23 May 1916, until its disbandment on 10 January 1920.

In March 1939, in preparation for the Italian invasion of Albania, the Tirana Overseas Expeditionary Corps (Corpo di Spedizione Oltre Mare Tirana, O.M.T.) was formed, comprising the 154th Murge Infantry Division, four Bersaglieri regiments and a Grenadier regiment. The invasion took place on 7 April, and after weak resistance, by 15 April the entire country was occupied and annexed to Italy. On the same day, the corps was renamed as the Albania Army Corps Command (Comando Corpo d'Armata Albania), comprising the 3rd Julia Alpine Division, the 7th Lupi di Toscana and 19th Venezia infantry divisions, and the Centauro Armoured Division. On 23 July, a Higher Forces Command Albania (Comando Superiore Truppe Albania) with a status of a field army was established as a higher instance, but on 1 December 1939 the two commands were merged as the Higher Forces Command Albania (XXVI Army Corps).

On 24 October 1940, in preparation for the Italian invasion of Greece on the 28th, the Higher Forces Command Albania—which soon after became the 11th Army—was divided into the XXVI Corps and the newly created XXV Corps Ciamuria. The corps occupied the eastern (right) half of the Italian front with Greece, between the Prespa Lakes and Mount Gobellit. It comprised the 49th Parma, 29th Piemonte, 19th Venezia, and 53rd Arezzo infantry divisions. The Corps' role during the early days of the Italian offensive was to mount diversionary attacks on the Greek front, but from 1 November the Greek troops of the Western Macedonia Army Section (TSDM) launched a counteroffensive, beginning an advance into Albania that was only halted at the Lake Ohrid–Tepeleni line. The front remained relatively stable thereafter, despite the attempt of the Italian Spring Offensive in March 1941 to achieve a breakthrough. Following the German invasion of Greece on 6 April, on 10 April the Italian forces in the Albanian front began their own advance against the retreating Greeks, arriving at the old Greco-Albanian border on 23 April, the day of the capitulation of the Greek army to the Germans.

On 4 May, the corps was redesignated as the Alpine Army Corps Command (XXVI) (Comando Corpo d'Armata Alpino (XXVI)) with the 2nd Tridentina and 5th Pusteria alpine divisions, until its dissolution on 15 June.

XXVI Corps was reconstituted on 1 August 1941, inheriting the units of the disbanded XXV Corps, the divisions Acqui, Modena, Julia, and Pusteria. Based at Ioannina, it assumed occupation duties in western Greece (Epirus and the Ionian Islands), in a coastal defence and anti-partisan role. In 1942, Julia was repatriated, but in spring 1943, it received operational control over the 1st German Mountain Division. The corps remained in place until the Italian armistice of September 1943, when it was disbanded.

Commanders
Higher Forces Command Albania/XXVI Corps (1939–1940)
 Generale di corpo d'armata Alfredo Guzzoni (1939.03 – 1939.12.01)
 Generale di corpo d'armata Carlo Geloso (1939.12.01 –	1940.06.05)	
 Generale di corpo d'armata Sebastiano Visconti Prasca (1940.06.05	– 1940.11.09)	

XXVI Corps/XXVI Alpine Corps (1940–1943)
 Generale di corpo d'armata Gabriele Nasci (1940.10.31	– 1941.05.04)	
 Generale di divisione Ugo Santovito (interim)
 Generale di divisione Alessandro Gloria (interim)
 Generale di corpo d'armata Guido Della Bona (1941.08.01 –	1943.09.08)

References

Army corps of Italy in World War I
Army corps of Italy in World War II
Epirus in World War II
Italian military units and formations of the Greco-Italian War
Military units and formations established in 1939
Military units and formations disestablished in 1943
Military units and formations of Italy in Greece in World War II